Makhateli is a surname. Notable people with the surname include:

David Makhateli, Georgian ballet dancer
Maia Makhateli, Georgian ballet dancer